Dimeria is a genus of Asian, Australian, Madagascan, and Pacific Island plants in the grass family. Many of the species are endemic to India.

 Species

 formerly included
see Arthraxon 
 Dimeria scrobiculata - Arthraxon hispidus

References

Andropogoneae
Poaceae genera